Yun Mun-Song() is a former international table tennis player from North Korea.

Career 
As a table tennis player, Yun won a bronze medal at the 1989 World Table Tennis Championships in the Swaythling Cup (men's team event) with Chu Jong-Chol, Kim Song-hui and Li Gun-Sang for North Korea.

See also
 List of table tennis players
 List of World Table Tennis Championships medalists

References

North Korean male table tennis players
World Table Tennis Championships medalists
Living people
Year of birth missing (living people)
20th-century North Korean people